Missisquoi Bay is a large extension in the northern part of Lake Champlain, at the East of the output of the latter in Richelieu River. The bay is divided between Quebec in Canada and Vermont in the United States. The main town on its banks is Venise-en-Québec, a major summer resort. The river of the same name flows into the bay and the Missisquoi National Wildlife Refuge is located on the American side.

Toponymy 

Champlain, first governor of New France, was the first European to visit the region. The name has an Abenaki origin, meaning "a lot of waterfowl" but other meanings are also thought possible. It appears officially in the eighteenth century in the concession document made on April 6, 1733 to Paul-Louis de Lusignan Dazemard as the "Missiskouy Bay". The spelling has changed several times. In 1855, when changes to electoral counties of Lower Canada into electoral districts, the Legislature finally adopts the form Missisquoi to designate the county and the region.

Geology 

Glaciers grounded in the Bay  years ago and then melted there forming the Champlain Sea approximately  years ago. The maximum depth of the bay is about 4.75 m and its bottom is made of regional marine deposits. The bay waters drain south into the Champlain Lake and the Richelieu River. Until the late 2000s, the water of the bay was stagnant and the bay was dying. At the opening of the new bridge on the US side, the old road causeway was partly demolished which brought a flow of fresh water from Lake Champlain.

Environment 

The bay has a great diversity of fauna and flora, including many species of birds, hence the establishment of a national refuge on the US side. Its beaches are very popular with vacationers in summer and its waters attract various activities, especially personal watercraft, boats, etc. In winter, anglers engage in ice fishing activity.

See also 

 Pike River (Missisquoi Bay), a stream (fr: Rivière aux Brochets (baie Missisquoi)
 Pike River North (Missisquoi Bay), a stream (fr: Rivière aux Brochets (baie Missisquoi)
 Richelieu River, a stream
 Lake Champlain, a body of water
 Rivière-aux-Brochets Ecological Reserve, a bay

References

External links 
 Le Wiki de la Baie Missisquoi
 Conservation Baie Missisquoi
 Site officiel du refuge faunique national de la baie Missisquoi

Bays of Quebec
Bays of the United States
Geography of Vermont
Landforms of Montérégie